Prunus fenzliana is a species of wild almond native to the Caucasus areas of Turkey, Armenia, Azerbaijan, Iran, and Turkmenistan, preferring to grow at 1400-3500m above sea level. On the basis of morphology it has been long thought to be one of the wild species that contributed to the origin of the cultivated almond (Prunus dulcis). Genetic testing of both nuclear and chloroplast DNA has confirmed that it is the closest relative (and presumed lone ancestor) of Prunus dulcis.

Description
Prunus fenzliana is a tall shrub or small tree reaching 4m. It can be distinguished from its close relatives by a number of features, including having one-year-old twigs that are reddish on the side exposed to the sun, green elsewhere. The fruits start a dark green and mature to light tan. When fully mature the fruits, much like its domesticated counterpart, pop open to reveal the seed which can be up to 1 cm long.

References

External links
 

fenzliana
Flora of Armenia
Flora of Azerbaijan
Flora of Iran
Flora of Turkey
Flora of Turkmenistan
Plants described in 1892